Walter Lee Jordan (born February 19, 1956) is an American former professional basketball player. A 6'7" small forward born in Perry, Alabama and from Purdue University, Jordan played one season (1980–81) with the Cleveland Cavaliers of the NBA. He scored 68 points and grabbed 42 rebounds in 30 games.

High school years
Jordan led Northrop High School, in (Fort Wayne, Indiana), to the single-class 1974 Indiana state basketball championship, coached by Robert Dille.

He was named to "Top 50″ All-time Northeast Indiana's Athletes of the Century and was inducted into Afro-American Hall of Fame, Ft. Wayne.  He was also named by the Indiana Basketball Hall of Fame as a member of the 1999 Silver Anniversary Team, and inducted into the Hall in 2003.

College career
Jordan was a major star at Purdue University from 1975 through 1978. He was two-time team MVP, three-time All-Big Ten and two time 1st Team All-Big Ten. He led the team in scoring three years, led the team in rebounding two years, and ended with a career average of 17 points a game, ranking him 6th (1,813 ppg) on Purdue's career scoring history.  He is also Purdue's 3rd all-time rebounder (882 rbs).

He was a member of the 1977 gold medal winning World University Games team which also featured Larry Bird, Sidney Moncrief, Darrell Griffith, Dave Corzine, Calvin Natt and Freeman Williams.

Professional career
In addition to his NBA season, Jordan played in the Spanish League for two seasons; the CBA for four seasons; and the WBA for one season.  He was named 1st Team, All-WBA for the 1978–79 season.

Current activities
Currently, Jordan lives in Atlanta where he is Executive Director/coach of Team Impact, Inc., an amateur youth basketball program.

References

1956 births
Living people
Albany Patroons players
American expatriate basketball people in Canada
American expatriate basketball people in Spain
American men's basketball players
Basketball players from Alabama
CB Valladolid players
Cleveland Cavaliers players
Detroit Spirits players
Hawaii Volcanos players
Joventut Badalona players
Liga ACB players
Montana Golden Nuggets players
New Jersey Nets draft picks
Purdue Boilermakers men's basketball players
Small forwards
Toronto Tornados players
Utica Olympics players
Western Basketball Association players